Zhang Liangmin (born October 12, 1985) is a blind Paralympian athlete from China competing mainly in throwing events.

She competed in the 2008 Summer Paralympics in Beijing, China. There she won a silver medal in the women's F12-13 discus throw event and also competed in the F12/13 shot put.

In the 2016 Summer Paralympics in Rio she took a gold medal in the discus after a throw of 36.65 metres. Silver medalist Tang Hongxia threw 35.01metres and Izabela Campos took the bronze with a throw of 32.60 metres.

In the 2020 Summer Paralympics in Rio she took a gold medal in the Discus Throw F11 with a world record of 40.83.

References

External links
 

1985 births
Paralympic athletes of China
Athletes (track and field) at the 2008 Summer Paralympics
Paralympic gold medalists for China
Paralympic silver medalists for China
Paralympic bronze medalists for China
Living people
Chinese female discus throwers
Chinese female shot putters
Chinese female javelin throwers
World record holders in Paralympic athletics
Medalists at the 2008 Summer Paralympics
Athletes (track and field) at the 2012 Summer Paralympics
Medalists at the 2012 Summer Paralympics
Medalists at the 2016 Summer Paralympics
Paralympic medalists in athletics (track and field)
Athletes (track and field) at the 2020 Summer Paralympics
Medalists at the 2020 Summer Paralympics
21st-century Chinese women